Ryan Christie (born July 3, 1978) is a Canadian former professional ice hockey player who played in the National Hockey League for the Dallas Stars and the Calgary Flames.

Career 
Drafted 112th overall by the Stars in the 1996 NHL Entry Draft, Christie played seven games in the NHL (five for the Stars and two for the Flames) scoring no points and no penalty minutes. He previously played in Italy for HC Milano Vipers, leading them to the Serie A title in 2006, their 5th championship in a row, leading the team in goals with 21 and penalty minutes in 98. Last season Christie led the team in goals again with 16 (along with Brett Lysak) but Milano lost out on another championship to SG Cortina.

References

External links

1978 births
Living people
Calgary Flames players
Canadian ice hockey left wingers
Dallas Stars draft picks
Dallas Stars players
HC Milano players
Ice hockey people from Ontario
Kalamazoo Wings (1974–2000) players
Las Vegas Wranglers players
Owen Sound Platers players
People from the Regional Municipality of Niagara
Saint John Flames players
Scorpions de Mulhouse players
Toronto Roadrunners players
Utah Grizzlies (IHL) players
Canadian expatriate ice hockey players in Italy
Canadian expatriate ice hockey players in the United States